Schinder is a mountain on the border of Bavaria, Germany and Tyrol, Austria. There are two summits, one called Austrian Schinder or Trausnitzberg (1808 m), and the other slightly lower one called Bavarian Schinder (1796 m). The former sits right on the border of Bavaria and Tyrol, whereas the latter is situated wholly in Bavaria.

Alpinism 
The easiest summit access route lies on the south side and passes alp Trausnitzalm. The north face of the Schinder forms an impressive cirque for such a relatively low altitude mountain, with an ascent that leads through that cirque.

References 

Mountains of Bavaria
Mountains of Tyrol (state)
Mountains of the Alps